Cerisy Forest (forêt de Cerisy or forêt de Balleroy), is a  beech woodland (75% of the land), located in the French Calvados and Manche departments.

Since 1976 it is a national nature reserve managed by l'Office national des forêts (ONF). At Cerisy, its goal partly resides in the conservation of an endemical golden sub-species of carabus auronitens : protected at national level.

Fauna

One can sight deer like stags, roe, as well as boars, badgers, foxes. 
One is advised to be careful and not perturb the population on foot as well as by car, as accidents are frequent.

Birds and other predators are varied and diverse; one can spot the black and |middle spotted woodpecker, long-eared owl and many other species, a pleasant area for both amateurs and ornithologists.
Amphibians and insects also constitute a huge wealth, namely the golden endemic carabus auronitens (Chrysocarabus auronitens ssp cupreonitens) but also Alpine newt, palmate newt, agile frog, salamanders. There are also remarkable butterflies and reptiles like the adder and common lizard.

Flora
Cerisy Forest is made up 75% of beech, 12% oak and 3% Scots pine.
There are also many other breeds such as birch, chestnut, black alder.
shrubs : holly, knee holm (protégé en forêt de Cerisy), walnut tree
and many flowers : wood spurge, foxglove, thimbleweed.

Surroundings

 Cerisy-la-Forêt is a village to the west of the forest. Its 11th century abbey was built on the site of a priory founded in 510 by Saint Vigor, bishop of Bayeux. it is a benedictine monastery.
Le Molay-Littry is a town north of the forest. It hosted the only coal mine in Normandy, of which a museum now stands.
Balleroy is a village south of the forest. Balleroy Castle (designed by François Mansart) was built from 1626 to 1636.

Other sites 
 La maison de la Forêt et du Tourisme (expositions sur la faune et flore en forêt de Cerisy, métiers liés au bois, animations pour groupes et individuels).
 Le moulin de Marcy au Molay-Littry.
 Les jardins de Castillon.
 Les étangs de Planquery.
 Le jardin d'Elle à Villiers-Fossard.
 Le parc des Sources d'Elle.

References

Forests of France
Geography of Normandy